DARÉGAL is a French company producing culinary herbs. In 1887 Amand Darbonne founded the bases for DARÉGAL in Milly-la-Forêt, the birthplace of aromatic and medicinal plants. This forerunner capitalized on the region's know-how, setting out to cultivate medicinal plants.

History 
 1887: Amand Darbonne set up in Milly-la-Forêt (France) to cultivate medicinal plants.
 1899: The first industrial open-air dryer was built for medicinal plants and infusions.
 1920: André Darbonne, 2nd generation, created the medicinal plant trade association in France.
 1954: Marc Darbonne, 3rd generation, launched dehydrated aromatic plants.
 1966: The largest continuous dehydration oven of the time was built.
 1976: Luc Darbonne, 4th generation, created IQF Frozen Aromatic Herbs.
 1993: A production unit was opened in Turlock, California: SUPHERB FARMS.
 2001: Gyma's frozen seasonings business was acquired.
 2009: A production unit was opened in Santaella, Spain.

Technology 

 INDIVIDUALLY QUICK FROZEN HERBS
 INDIVIDUALLY QUICK FROZEN ORGANIC HERBS
 DEHYDRATED HERBS
 BITEMPERATURE AROMATIC HERBS
 PUMPABLE AROMATIC HERBS
 NATURAL EXTRACTS
 FROZEN HERB PASTES
 FRESH DRY PLUS (FD+)

Certifications 
 ISO 9001 - 2000
 IFS - version 5
 BRC - version 5
 Marks & Spencer Field to Fork
 Biological Production
 Kosher

External links
 www.daregal.com
 US website: www.daregalgourmet.com

Food and drink companies of France
Food and drink companies established in 1887
French companies established in 1887
Companies based in Île-de-France